"Romeo & Juliet" is a song recorded by Kosovo-Albanian rapper Mozzik and Swiss-Albanian rapper Loredana. An Albanian and German rap song, it was solely written by the rappers themselves. German producers Miksu and Macloud were additionally hired for the song's composition and production process.

Background

Composition 

In terms of music notation, "Romeo & Juliet" was composed in  time and is performed in the key of F minor in common time with a tempo of 125 beats per minute. The song was solely written by both Loredana and Mozzik. Its composition and production process was handled by Joshua Allery (Miksu) and Laurin Auth (Macloud). The song marks the second time that the couple has collaborated musically on a recording, after their collaboration on "Bonnie & Clyde" in 2018.

Promotion 

The accompanying music video was produced and shot by Entermedia and premiered onto the official YouTube channel of Loredana on 31 January 2018, where it has since amassed a total of 65 million views.

Personnel 

Credits adapted from Tidal.

 Loredana – performing, vocals, songwriting
 Mozzik – performing, vocals, songwriting
 Macloud (Laurin Auth) – composition, production
 Miksu (Joshua Allery) – composition, production

Charts

Release history

References 

2019 singles
2019 songs
Mozzik songs
Loredana Zefi songs
Albanian-language songs
German-language Albanian songs
Song recordings produced by Macloud
Song recordings produced by Miksu
Songs written by Loredana Zefi